The Loch Ness Monster a cryptid that reputedly inhabits the Loch Ness lake in Scotland.

Loch Ness Monster may also refer to:
 Alex Harvey Presents: The Loch Ness Monster, an album by Alex Harvey
 Loch Ness Monster (roller coaster), a roller coaster in Busch Gardens Williamsburg
 The Loch Ness Monster (wrestler), British professional wrestler
 Loch Ness monster surface, a surface in mathematics
 "Loch Ness Monster", a hockey segment by Glenn Healy

See also
 Nessie (disambiguation)